Kayle Connor (born 8 January 1990) is an Australian Rugby league player who currently plays for Workington Town in the Kingstone Press Championship 1 competition in the United Kingdom.

Career

Connor is a product of the Brisbane Broncos youth setup. Connor played for Norths Devils in the Queensland Cup before signing for Brisbane rivals Souths Logan Magpies.

Starting his career in Rugby Union Connor represented Queensland Schoolboys at a younger age before making the switch to Rugby League.

References

1990 births
Living people
Workington Town players
Australian rugby league players
Rugby league five-eighths
Rugby league halfbacks
Rugby league fullbacks